The 2021 Asian Indoor and Martial Arts Games, officially known as the 6th Asian Indoor and Martial Arts Games and also known as Bangkok–Chonburi 2021, is scheduled to be a pan-Asian multi-sport event in indoor and martial arts sports held from 17 to 26 November 2023 in the Thai capital city, Bangkok and the province of Chonburi. Originally due to take place from 21 to 30 May 2021, the event was postponed in January 2021 as a result of the COVID-19 pandemic. The Olympic Council of Asia (OCA) officially awarded the games to Bangkok and Chonburi Province and signed the hosting rights contract in April 2020.
 
It will be the first Asian Indoor and Martial Arts Games, co-hosted by two cities/provinces; the Thai capital city of Bangkok which will host the games for the third time after hosting the inaugural edition in 2005 and the martial arts edition in 2009 and the province of Chonburi, located 100 kilometres southeast of the capital. It will be a test event for the joint candidacy from Bangkok and Chonburi Province for hosting 2030 Summer Youth Olympic Games also. This edition was most notable for being the first edition to include badminton, baseball5, BMX cycling, cheerleading, floorball, indoor rowing, netball, shooting and volleyball; as well as having the highest number of sports in the history of the games, at a total of 30.

Bidding process
On November 28, National Olympic Committee of Thailand (NOCT) President Yuthasak Sasiprapha initially expressed possible of Thai's Asian Indoor and Martial Arts Games bid in 2021 to OCA Director General Husain A.H.Z. Al-Musallam during 2015 ANOC General Assembly in the United States. On 17 October 2017, OCA President Ahmed Al-Fahad Al-Ahmed Al-Sabah met Thai government officials to offer Thailand hosting Asian Indoor and Martial Arts Games in 2021 while Deputy Prime Minister Thanasak Patimaprakorn also interested this offer and mulled over Pattaya to host this games, but Federation of National Sport Association (FONSA) President Intarat Yodbangtoey suggested that Thai government should bargain OCA to host 2030 Asian Games if Thailand receive hosting 2021 Asian Indoor and Martial Arts Games.

During 2019 OCA General Assembly in Bangkok, Thailand expressed interest to host four major events (between 2021 and 2030), that is, 2021 Asian Indoor and Martial Arts Games, 2025 Asian Youth Games, 2026 Summer Youth Olympics and 2030 Asian Games. Finally, Bangkok and Chonburi were selected from OCA and signed the host city contract on 27 April 2020 in a virtual meeting.

Development and preparation
The cabinet resolution was released on March 17, 2020. It reported the negotiations with the Olympic Council of Asia and the budget allocation for the Games. The Olympic Council of Asia reduced a cost of marketing right from ~US$2 million to ~US$500 thousand. It distributed a broadcasting right to two parts that one is a local broadcasting right for the host country and the other one is an international broadcasting right shared the Organizing Committee with 50 percent. It also allowed Bangkok and Chonburi Province to host the Games as joint host cities.

A budget allocation for the Games had been reported to be ฿1.4855 billion (~US$48 million), including ฿50 million (~US$1.6 million) from a broadcasting right, ฿100 million (~US$3.2 million) from a marketing agent, ฿87.5 million (~US$2.8 million) from a registration fee, ฿2.5 million (~US$80 thousand) from revenue of the Games, and ฿1.2455 billion (~US$40 million) from the government. It also suggested the Organizing Committee to provide more budget for Coronavirus disease 2019 prevention management by Ministry of Tourism and Sports and Ministry of Public Health.

On 20 May 2020, the Olympic Council of Asia announced that Dato Seri Chaipak Siriwat was appointed as a vice president of the Olympic Council of Asia from the host country representative to work closely with the Olympic Council of Asia in the successful execution of the 6th Asian Indoor and Martial Art Games. The OCA Coordination Committee, permanent committee not depending on any Games, will be responsible for the conduct of the five different Games organised by the Olympic Council of Asia. It is headed by Randhir Singh elected for the period 2019 to 2023, during the 38th OCA General Assembly held in Bangkok. The full composition of the Coordination Committee is as follows:

The meeting of the preparation of the 6th Asian Indoor and Martial Art Games was held on June 15, 2020. Chaipak Siriwat, vice president of the Olympic Council of Asia, informed officially about competition programme confirmed by the Olympic Council of Asia. It was confirmed that the Games will be held between 21 and 30 May, including consideration of the events in the twenty-nine sports and two demonstration sports proposed by the Organizing Committee. Fourteen sports complexes were also confirmed, including eight in Bangkok and six in Chonburi.

The meeting proposed to launch the Public Health Commission encouraged by Department of Health and Ministry of Public Health. It recommended Coronavirus disease 2019 preventive measures in two ways depended on whether the pandemic is over or not. One is to allow athletes and officials quarantining for fourteen day, before the curtain will rise on the Games.

Venues
Bangkok and surrounding
Five sport events will be held at the SAT Sports Complex, which were some of the main venues of the 1966, 1970, 1978, and 1998 Asian Games, the 2005 Asian Indoor Games, the 2007 Summer Universiade, and the 2009 Asian Martial Arts Games.
Extreme Sport Arena – BMX cycling, roller sports
Indoor Stadium Huamark – futsal (men's group stage and quarter-finals)
Rajamangala Stadium – sport climbing
Shooting Range – shooting
Three sport events will be held at the National Stadium and Chulalongkorn University, which were some of the main venues of the 1966, 1970, 1978, and 1998 Asian Games, the 2005 Asian Indoor Games, the 2007 Summer Universiade, and the 2009 Asian Martial Arts Games.
Chaloem Rajasuda Sport Complex – 3x3 basketball
Chantana Yingyong Stadium – netball
Nimibutr Stadium – badminton
Two sport events will be held at the Bangkok Youth Center (Thai-Japan), which were some of the main venues of the 1998 Asian Games, the 2005 Asian Indoor Games, the 2007 Summer Universiade, and the 2009 Asian Martial Arts Games.
Gymnasium 1 – indoor hockey
Gymnasium 2 – floorball
Two sport events will be held at the Assumption University Suvarnabhumi Campus in surrounding Samut Prakan Province, which were some of the main venues of the 2007 Summer Universiade.
Aquatic Center – short course swimming
Gymnasium – pencak silat
Additionally, stand-alone sports venues were located in various districts:
Bangkok Arena in Nong Chok District – futsal (men's semi-finals and finals)
Bangkok Thonburi University in Thawi Watthana District – futsal (women's tournament)
Fashion Island Shopping Mall in Khan Na Yao District – sepaktakraw
Major Ratchayothin Bangkok in Chatuchak District – bowling
Another stand-alone sports venue was located in surrounding Pathum Thani Province: 
Rangsit University – FPV drone racing, Teqball

Chonburi
Thirteen sport events will be held in Pattaya City, which were some of the main venues of the 2005 Asian Indoor Games.
Ambassador Jomtien Center – billiard sports, chess, indoor rowing, kurash
Eastern National Sports Training Center – indoor athletics
Nongnooch Garden Pattaya – dancesport, ju-jitsu, karate, muaythai, sambo, taekwondo, wrestling
Terminal 21 Pattaya Shopping Mall – esports
Other sports venues were located in capital Mueang Chonburi District:
Multi Function Sports Stadium, Chonburi Town Municipality – volleyball (women's tournament)
Sripatum University Chonburi Campus – kickboxing
Thailand National Sports University Chonburi Campus – volleyball (men's tournament)

The Games

Sports

The article 74 of the Olympic Council of Asia constitution states that the programme of the AIMAG shall include not less than six indoor sports and two sports from martial arts sports, recognised by the Olympic Council of Asia. For this to happen, it will be a responsibility of the organizing committee to choose which of twenty-nine sports included within the status of indoor sports or martial arts sports and not part in latest editions of the Asian Games. The organizing committee can choose any sports part in latest editions of the Asian Games or not within the status of indoor sports or martial arts sports, if there are demands from the host country.

Following the signing contract after successful negotiations with Thailand, the Olympic Council of Asia initially announced that the Games would feature twenty-six disciplines in twenty-four sports, including the seventeen indoor sports and seven martial sports and two demonstration sports established in the Games charter. On 21 May 2020, the Olympic Council of Asia and the organizing committee announced the final number of sports on this edition's program with finals being held in twenty eight sports, seven more than those held in the previous edition in 2017. The number of sports programme increased to twenty-nine sports after successful negotiations to add Olympic and Asian Games sports who are very popular at the country as shooting, badminton and volleyball, but this sports have to held non-olympic events.

Due to a ban imposed by the International Weightlifting Federation on Thailand, weightlifting events have to be excluded.

A total of thirty-two disciplines in thirty sports and two demonstration sports are scheduled to include.

Demonstration sports

Sports program
Cheerleading, Floorball, Indoor rowing and Netball are sports that have recently been approved by International Olympic Committee and are on the World Games program and have low popularity and visibity in certain regions of Asia.However, in another countries or regions of the continent they are extremely popular. Going according to the original proposal of the event, this is their chance to be part of the sports program of a multisport event, which certainly increases their visibility on the continent and increase the chances that they will be included in the Olympic Games program in the future.

Olympic Sports played in other formats
Twelve sports that are part of the current Olympic program (athletics, badminton, 3x3 basketball, football, hockey, karate, roller sports, rowing, shooting, swimming, water polo and taekwondo) are in this edition's program, however, some of them will be played in formats that are not part of the Olympic Games. Among these, three are new sports (badminton, shooting, and volleyball). Although they are part of the Asian Games programme too, the organizing committee will revamp the events to differ from current Asian Games programme. Badminton events will be reduced from 7 to 3. The number of events in the shooting will also drop from 20 to just 5,only the pistol events (10 and 25 meters) are scheduled to be held. Changes will also happen in volleyball tournaments. Each participating team will be able to register 12 athletes, however, up to 3 athletes may be over 23 years old.
This measure was taken due to the congestion of the sport calendar in 2021, as the event was scheduled to coincides to the FIVB Volleyball Nations League first three weeks.

Another specific case is that of sepak takraw, after 12 years hiatus the sport will be back on the program. As the national sport of Thailand, the format of the competitions and the number of events at the last Asian Games will be maintained. In addition, the four events that were excluded from Jakarta will be back, along the hoop, it is expected that five new mixed events will be added to the program.

Participating National Olympic Committees
On July 16, 2020, the National Olympic Committee of Thailand announced that it proposed to the Olympic Council of Asia (OCA) to open the event for athletes from the 24 National Olympic Committees from the Oceania National Olympic Committees (ONOC). The proposal was accepted without any reservations by the OCA and the ONOC, as they proved the success on the 2017 Games held in Ashgabat and 2017 Sapporo Winter Games. The three stakeholders are planning to authorize the registration of athletes in 16 individual sports as integral part of the games.
The numbers in parenthesis represents the number of participants entered.

Notes

Calendar
All dates are ICT (UTC+7)

Marketing

Emblem
The emblem of the 2021 Asian Indoor and Martial Arts Games is inspired by the flower garland called Phuang malai, symbolizing the interconnectedness of all participants from all parts of Asia. Thai garland represents respect, victory, dignity, and the power of hope. The official slogan of the games is "Garland of Hope".

Mascots
The official mascot depicting a fighting parrot wearing a mongkhon (a type of headgear worn by Muay Thai athletes) who has intelligence, agility and a fighting spirit, making a gesture of inviting athletes and sports competitors to the victory of friendship.

See also

Asian Indoor and Martial Arts Games celebrated in Thailand
2005 Asian Indoor Games – Bangkok
2009 Asian Martial Arts Games – Bangkok

References

External links

 
Asian Games, Indoor and Martial Arts
Asian Games, Indoor and Martial Arts
Asian Games, Indoor and Martial Arts
Asian Games, Indoor and Martial Arts 2023
Asian Games, Indoor and Martial Arts
2023
Sports events postponed due to the COVID-19 pandemic